The 2016 season was Washington Spirit's fourth season, competing in the National Women's Soccer League, the top division of women's soccer in the United States.

Review
Building off the successes of the previous two playoff appearances the Spirit hired former Sky Blue FC manager, Jim Gabarra to replace Mark Parsons.

The Spirit would see their most successful season to date in 2016, being league leaders in the standings throughout most of the season. Only in the final week would the Spirit's loss at Chicago Red Stars finalize them as league runners-up.

Returning to the playoffs, the Spirit earned their first post-season victory in a revenge effort against Chicago Red Stars, who just a week earlier denied them the league title. The match was sent into extra time where Francisca Ordega scored the game-winner in the 111th minute. Advancing to the final for the first time in club history, the Spirit faced Western New York Flash in Houston, Texas.

The 2016 NWSL Final played to a 1–1 draw in regulation, and finished 2–2 at the end of extra time; both Spirit goals scored by Crystal Dunn. Going into penalties, Western New won 3–2 with only Christine Nairn and Katie Stengel slotting their penalties.

National Anthem Protest
The week prior to a match with the Spirit, Seattle Reign FC and U.S. women's national soccer team player Megan Rapinoe knelt during the national anthem in a game on September 5, 2016, explaining that her decision was a "nod to Kaepernick and everything that he's standing for right now". Anticipating Rapinoe's protest, Spirit owner Bill Lynch, moved the national anthem's performance ahead of the Spirit-Reign match without warning or notice to occur before the players' appearances on the pitch. Jeff Plush, the league's commissioner, was present at the game and told reporters that he was unaware of Lynch's plans and disagreed with the act of moving the anthem's performance. The Spirit's players issued a joint statement also disagreeing with Lynch's decision to move the anthem without first consulting the team's players or coaches.

Club

Roster
The first-team roster of Washington Spirit.

 (FP)

 (FP)

 (FP)

 (FP)

 (FP)

 (FP) = Federation player

Team management 

Source:

Competitions

Preseason 
On January 26, the Washington Spirit announced its preseason schedule.

Regular season

Regular-season standings

Results summary

NWSL Playoffs

Squad statistics
Source: NWSL

Squad statistics are of regular season only

Transfers

In

Out

Honors and awards

NWSL Yearly Awards

NWSL Team of the Year

NWSL Player of the Month

NWSL Weekly Awards

NWSL Player of the Week

NWSL Goal of the Week

See also
 2016 National Women's Soccer League season

References 

Match reports (preseason)

Match reports (regular season)

Notes

External links 
 

Washington Spirit seasons
Washington Spirit
Washington Spirit
Washington Spirit